UoSAT-4, also known as UO-15 and OSCAR-15, is a British satellite in Low Earth Orbit. It was built by a spin-off company of the University of Surrey, Surrey Satellite Technology (SSTL) and launched in January 1990 from French Guiana. 

UoSAT-4 was launched on the same rocket as its sister satellite, UoSAT-3.

Mission
UoSAT-4 carried equipment to supplement UoSAT-3, but failed after two days in orbit.

The satellite forms part of the growing amounts of orbital debris orbiting around the Earth. The payload will decay in the Earth's atmosphere some time in the future.

References 

University of Surrey
Satellites orbiting Earth
Amateur radio satellites
Satellites of the United Kingdom
Spacecraft launched in 1990